Marinus Børup (27 June 1891 – 15 September 1959) was a Danish writer. His work was part of the literature event in the art competition at the 1932 Summer Olympics.

References

1891 births
1959 deaths
20th-century Danish male writers
Olympic competitors in art competitions
People from Aarhus